The Expo Line Bikeway is a  Los Angeles County, California rail with trail bicycle path and pedestrian route that travels roughly parallel to the Metro’s E Line train tracks between the Exposition Park area near the USC campus and downtown Santa Monica near the Pacific Ocean. The Expo Line Bikeway is one of two major bicycle routes in Los Angeles that share dedicated rights-of-way with mass transit, the other being the Orange Line Bikeway in the San Fernando Valley.

The Santa Monica Air Line used the right-of-way from 1909 to 1953. The track was last used for freight in 1988; the county transportation agency bought the route from Southern Pacific Railroad in 1991.

Rails-to-trails advocacy groups quickly began agitating for a bike route along the Exposition corridor, with one 1992 Los Angeles Times article prophetically headlined: “A Better Path: There Are 12.2 Miles of Abandoned Rail Beds That Could Be Turned Into a Trail for Bikers, Joggers and Walkers From USC to Santa Monica, but There Is Resistance.”

Twenty years later, in 2012, the first section of the Exposition corridor bikeway opened to the public.

The Expo Line Bikeway connects to the Ballona Creek Bike Path (and Park to Playa Trail) at National Boulevard in Culver City. The connection between the two paths is at the Bike Path Bridge over Ballona Creek; the bridge originally carried the southbound lanes of National until the construction of the E Line overpass and a new four-lane National Boulevard bridge.

Route
 Eastern trailhead coordinates: 
 Western trailhead coordinates:

Eastern segment (aka Phase I)
 Trailhead: Expo/Vermont station
 Trailhead: Culver City station, specifically Platform Park at Washington and National under the track
 Distance: 
 Route: This section is largely a Class III bike route (bicycles share a main road with a car traffic), but there is short separated bike path segment between LaCienega/Jefferson station and the western terminus. There is a dogleg turn on Harcourt Avenue between the  stretch on Jefferson Blvd. and the  section on La Cienega Blvd. There is an eastbound crossing of the train tracks at South Gramercy Place. Just before the western end of the Phase I/eastern segment of the Expo Bikeway, there is access to the Ballona Creek Bike Path which continues six miles west to the ocean, connecting to the Coastal Bike Trail.

Central segment

 Trailhead: Culver City station
 Trailhead: Palms station, Exposition Boulevard and Palms Boulevard northeast corner
 Distance: 
 Notes: Separated from traffic except at crossings

Western segment (aka Phase II)

 Trailhead: Westwood/Rancho Park station, corner of Selby Avenue and Exposition Blvd.
 Trailhead: 17th Street/Santa Monica College station
 Distance: 
 Notes: Separated from traffic except at crossings “There are good bikeway connections in the area, but people unfamiliar with the vicinity would be well served by [signage] to the beach, the Michigan Avenue Neighborhood Greenway (MANGo), Santa Monica College, and other destinations.”

Gaps
There are two intervals lacking either clear on-street navigation or a separated route.

Culver Junction gap

 Trailhead: National Boulevard and Wesley Avenue
 Trailhead: Behind Venice Crossroads shopping center
 Distance:

Northvale gap

 Trailhead: Palms station
 Trailhead: Westwood/Rancho Park station
 Route: Northvale Avenue and Overland Avenue  or National Boulevard and Westwood Boulevard, passing under Interstate 10
 Distance:   
 Notes: A plan to close the gap and connect the central and western segments is approved and funded; completion is expected by 2025.

Access 
Dedicated parking lots for “park and ride” commuters are available at 17th/SMC, Expo/Bundy, Expo/Sepulveda, Culver City, Jefferson/La Cienega, and Expo/Crenshaw stations.

Points of interest
The origin point of the western segment includes the Westwood Neighborhood Greenway, a linear park completed 2020, that “daylights” the Brown Canyon Creek that had been funneled underground since 1958. The Greenway was built on a railroad right-of-way that was not otherwise occupied by the train tracks or bike route.

There is a bicycle repair shop and a secured bike garage located within the Culver City station at about the halfway point along the route.

See also
 Rail with trail
 California bikeway classifications
 List of Los Angeles bike paths

References

External links
 Los Angeles Bikeway Map (Metro.net) - HTML
  Los Angeles Bikeway Map (Metro.net) - PDF hosted on Dropbox
 Heal the Bay: City to the Sea/Expo Line scavenger hunt/points of interest (PDF)
 Westwood Neighborhood Greenway
 YouTube video of the route from Santa Monica to Culver City, via helmet cam (2016)
 Helpful transportation engineer critique of Phase 1 design

Bikeway
Bike paths in Los Angeles
Rail trails in California
Parks in Los Angeles County, California
Transportation in Culver City, California
Santa Monica, California
2012 establishments in California